Jardines del Humaya is a cemetery outside the city of Culiacán, in the Mexican state of Sinaloa, established in 1969. The cemetery has gained notoriety for its mausoleums built for deceased cartel members that are unique and lavish in their style.  They resemble real life houses and the associated opulence that these cartel members were used to prior to their deaths.

Notable burials
 Marcos Arturo Beltrán Leyva (1967–2009) – Drug lord
 Inés “El Ingeniero” Calderón Quintero (1954–1988) – Organized crime figure
 Amado Carrillo Fuentes (1954–1997) – Drug lord
 Manuel Clouthier (1934–1989) – Politician
 Ignacio Coronel Villarreal (1954–2010) – Drug lord

 Manuel Torres Félix (1958–2012) – Drug lord

References

External links
 

Cemeteries in Mexico
Buildings and structures in Sinaloa
Culiacán